Sigmund Suttner (born 7 February 1953) is a German ice hockey player. He competed in the men's tournament at the 1980 Winter Olympics.

References

External links
 

1953 births
Living people
German ice hockey goaltenders
Olympic ice hockey players of West Germany
Ice hockey players at the 1980 Winter Olympics
People from Bad Tölz
Sportspeople from Upper Bavaria